Fitzroy Bertram Crozier (born 28 November 1936, Colombo, Ceylon) is a former cricketer who played first-class cricket for Ceylon from 1957 to 1967.

Born in Colombo, Crozier attended Royal College and captained the First XI in his final year, 1956. A slow left-arm orthodox spin bowler, he played for Ceylon in the Gopalan Trophy match in 1956–57, but did not play again until he was a surprise selection in the side that toured Pakistan in 1966–67.

Pakistan won all three matches between the two teams by wide margins, losing only 27 wickets in the process. Crozier took 14 of those wickets for 372, at an average of 26.57. He took 6 for 135 off 64 overs in Pakistan's first innings in the first match, and 7 for 133 in Pakistan's only innings in the third match. He also top-scored with 57 as an opening batsman in the second innings of the second match.

He later went to live in Australia. In September 2018, he was one of 49 former Sri Lankan cricketers felicitated by Sri Lanka Cricket, to honour them for their services before Sri Lanka became a full member of the International Cricket Council (ICC).

References

External links
 
 Fitzroy Crozier at CricketArchive

1936 births
Living people
All-Ceylon cricketers
Alumni of Royal College, Colombo
Australian people of Sri Lankan descent
People from British Ceylon
Cricketers from Colombo